Alberto Tassotti (15 June 1918 – 29 June 2008) was an Italian cross-country skier. He competed in the men's 18 kilometre event at the 1948 Winter Olympics.

References

External links
 

1918 births
2008 deaths
Italian male cross-country skiers
Italian male Nordic combined skiers
Olympic cross-country skiers of Italy
Olympic Nordic combined skiers of Italy
Cross-country skiers at the 1948 Winter Olympics
Nordic combined skiers at the 1948 Winter Olympics
People from Paluzza
Sportspeople from Friuli-Venezia Giulia